China Glory Continental Cycling Team is a UCI Continental team, founded in 2021, that is based in Beijing, China.

Team roster

References

External links

UCI Continental Teams (Asia)
Cycling teams based in China
Cycling teams established in 2021